Carmen García may refer to:

 Carmen García González (1905–1980), first lady of Mexico
 Carmen García Rosado (born 1926), educator, author and activist for the rights of women veterans
 Carmen García Maura (born 1945), Spanish actress
 Carmen M. Garcia (born 1957/1958), former Chief Judge of Trenton Municipal Court
 Carmen García (politician) (born 1963), Bolivian politician
 María del Carmen García (born 1969), Cuban high jumper 
 Carmen Laura García (born  1987), Spanish beauty queen
 María del Carmen García Alcay (active 1989–2000), Spanish karateka
 Maica García Godoy (born 1990), Spanish water polo player

See also
 Carme García (born 1974), Spanish visually impaired para-alpine skier, blind sailor and journalist